The Douglas Horn Trophy - also called the Douglas JL Horn Memorial Cup - was established as a perpetual rugby union trophy between Canada and Scotland in 2008.

Douglas Horn is the father of Alan Horn, a board member of Rugby Canada, while the trophy is essentially to recognise the long-standing relationship between Canada and Scotland in both the rugby world and international relations.

Scotland are the current holders winning 48 –10 in Edmonton in June 2018.

Scotland have held the cup for the entirety of its existence.

Matches

Results
 – Summer Test
 – Autumn International

References

Rugby union international rivalry trophies
International rugby union competitions hosted by Canada
International rugby union competitions hosted by Scotland
2008 establishments in Canada
2008 establishments in Scotland